Karevo is the name of two rural localities in Russia:

Karevo, Pskov Oblast, a village in Kunyinsky District of Pskov Oblast
Karevo, Vladimir Oblast, a village in Sudogodsky District of Vladimir Oblast